Phil Whitlock (1 May 1930 – December 2009) was a Welsh footballer, who played as a wing half in the Football League for Chester.

References

Chester City F.C. players
Cardiff City F.C. players
Caernarfon Town F.C. players
English Football League players
Association football wing halves
1930 births
2009 deaths
Welsh footballers
Sportspeople from Blaenau Gwent